A hangaroc was an apron-like outer garment worn by women of Norse origins in the 8th, 9th and 10th centuries.  In its usual form the hangaroc comprised a woollen or linen tailored tube wrapped around the body under the armpits and suspended by a pair of cloth straps that ran over the shoulders.  It hung down to mid-calf.

Hangarocs were usually secured by a pair of oval brooches, called "tortoise brooches", which are diagnostic of women's graves from the period.  Wealthier women would wear their hangaroc decorated with braided wool or embroidery.

References
Links

Bibliography

 Graham-Campbell, James and Wilson, David M.  The Viking World.  Frances Lincoln ltd, 2001.  
 Jesch, Professor Judith. Women in the Viking Age. Boydell Press, 1991. 
 Wolf, Kirsten.  Daily Life of the Vikings.  Greenwood Publishing Group, 2004.  

History of clothing (Western fashion)
Medieval European costume
Early Germanic clothing
Women in early Germanic culture